Punta Raisi railway station, is located within Palermo Airport (IATA code: PMO) in Cinisi, near Palermo, Sicily, Italy.  Opened in 2004, the station is the northwestern terminus of the Palermo Passante railway, and forms part of the Palermo Metro.

The station is managed by Rete Ferroviaria Italiana (RFI).  Train services are operated by Trenitalia.  Both companies are subsidiaries of Ferrovie dello Stato (FS), Italy's state-owned rail company.

Location
Punta Raisi railway station is situated underground, directly opposite the airport terminal, and is accessible through the terminal.

History
The station is part of the extension of Metropolitana di Palermo Line A from Piraineto railway station to the airport.  The construction of this extension began in 2001, and the station was opened in 2004.

Features
The station is equipped with three platforms, all of them for passenger service.

Train movements

Punta Raisi is now the northwestern terminus of Line A.  Trains operate between Punta Raisi and Palermo Centrale.  On weekdays, a train runs in each direction approximately every 30 minutes between early morning and around 10 pm.

See also

History of rail transport in Italy
List of railway stations in Sicily
Rail transport in Italy
Railway stations in Italy

References

External links

This article is based upon a translation of the Italian language version as at February 2011.

Airport railway stations in Italy
Railway stations in Sicily
Railway stations opened in 2004
Transport in Palermo